Syed Taufiq Tirmizi (18 August 1960 – 9 April 2020) was a Pakistani cricketer who played in twelve first-class matches between 1976 and 1981. Tirmizi died of cardiac arrest.

References

External links
 

1960 births
2020 deaths
Pakistani cricketers
Karachi cricketers
House Building Finance Corporation cricketers
Place of birth missing